Baruipur Government Polytechnic, established in 2013,  is a government polytechnic located in Baruipur,  South 24 Parganas district, West Bengal. This polytechnic is affiliated to the West Bengal State Council of Technical Education,  and recognized by AICTE, New Delhi. This polytechnic offers diploma courses in Electrical, Mechanical and civil Engineering.automobile Engineering is coming soon.

References

External links
 

Universities and colleges in South 24 Parganas district
Educational institutions established in 2013
2013 establishments in West Bengal
Technical universities and colleges in West Bengal